The Emmanuel Society was founded by the Archbishop M. A. Thomas. The headquarters of the Emmanuel Society in India is in Kota, Rajasthan. The society runs various schools in different districts of Rajasthan under the name of Emmanuel Mission Schools. These schools are Christian schools and the administration consist of Protestant Christians. This society also runs orphanages in Kota. The founder of the society got the president award for services to the society and the nation.

Christian organisations based in India
Organisations based in Rajasthan
Year of establishment missing